The Nastro d'Argento (Silver Ribbon) is a film award assigned each year, since 1946, by Sindacato Nazionale dei Giornalisti Cinematografici Italiani ("Italian National Syndicate of Film Journalists"), the association of Italian film critics.

This is the list of Nastro d'Argento awards for Best Producer. Angelo Barbagallo, Mario Cecchi Gori and Nanni Moretti are the most awarded Producers in this category, with 5 awards each.

1950s 
1954 – Peg Film – I Vitelloni
1955 – Dino De Laurentiis, Carlo Ponti – La Strada
1956 – Cines – Amici per la pelle
1957 – Carlo Ponti – The Railroad Man
1958 – Dino De Laurentiis – Nights of Cabiria
1959 – Franco Cristaldi – A Man of Straw, La sfida, Big Deal on Madonna Street

1960s 
1960 – Goffredo Lombardo – for the whole productions
1961 – Dino De Laurentiis – for the whole productions
1962 – Alfredo Bini – for the whole productions
1963 – Goffredo Lombardo – for the whole productions
1964 – Angelo Rizzoli – 8½
1965 – Franco Cristaldi – for the whole productions
1966 – Marco Vicario – Sette uomini d'oro
1967 – Antonio Musu – The Battle of Algiers
1968 – Alfredo Bini – Oedipus Rex
1969 – Luigi Carpentieri, Ermanno Donati – Il giorno della civetta

1970s 
1970 – Alberto Grimaldi – for the whole productions
1971 – Silvio Clementelli – The Fifth Day of Peace
1972 – Mario Cecchi Gori – for the whole productions
1973 – Alberto Grimaldi – for the whole productions
1974 – Franco Cristaldi – for the whole productions
1975 – Rusconi Film – Conversation Piece
1976 – Andrea Rizzoli – My Friends
1977 – Edmondo Amati – for the whole productions
1978 – RAI TV – for the whole productions
1979 – RAI TV – for the whole productions

1980s 
1980 – Franco Cristaldi, Nicola Carraro – for the whole productions
1981 – Fulvio Lucisano, Mauro Berardi – Ricomincio da tre
1982 – Mario Cecchi Gori, Vittorio Cecchi Gori – for the whole productions
1983 – RAI TV – for the whole productions
1984 – Gianni Minervini – Where's Picone?
1985 – Fulvio Lucisano – for the whole productions
1986 – Fulvio Lucisano – for the whole productions
1987 – Franco Committeri – The Family
1988 – Angelo Barbagallo, Nanni Moretti
1989 – Mario Cecchi Gori, Vittorio Cecchi Gori – for the whole productions

1990s 
1990 – Claudio Bonivento – Mery per sempre
1991 – Mario Cecchi Gori, Vittorio Cecchi Gori – for the whole productions
1992 – Angelo Barbagallo, Nanni Moretti – The Yes Man
1993 – Angelo Rizzoli – for the whole productions
1994 – Fulvio Lucisano, Leo Pescarolo, Guido De Laurentiis – The Great Pumpkin
1995 – Mario Cecchi Gori, Vittorio Cecchi Gori – for the whole productions
1996 – Angelo Barbagallo, Nanni Moretti – The Second Time
1997 – Antonio Avati, Pupi Avati, Aurelio De Laurentiis – Festival
1998 – Marco Risi, Maurizio Tedesco – Hamam
1999 – Medusa Produzione – The Legend of 1900

2000s 
2000 – Giuseppe Tornatore – The Prince's Manuscript
2001 – Tilde Corsi, Gianni Romoli – The Ignorant Fairies
2002 – Fandango – for the year's production
2003 – Fandango – L'imbalsamatore, Remember Me, My Love, Velocità massima
2004 – Angelo Barbagallo – The Best of Youth
2005 – Aurelio De Laurentiis – Tutto in quella notte
2006 – Riccardo Tozzi, Marco Chimenz, Giovanni Stabilini – The Beastin the Heart, Romanzo Criminale, Once You're Born You Can No Longer Hide
2007 – Nanni Moretti, Angelo Barbagallo – The Caiman
2008 – Domenico Procacci – Quiet Chaos, La giusta distanza, Lascia perdere, Johnny!, Le ragioni dell'aragosta, Silk
2009 – Fabio Conversi, Maurizio Coppolecchia, Nicola Giuliano, Andrea Occhipinti, Francesca Cima – Il Divo

2010s 
2010 – Giorgio Diritti, Simone Bachini – The Man Who Will Come
2011 – Domenico Procacci, Nanni Moretti – We Have a Pope
2012 – Domenico Procacci – Diaz – Don't Clean Up This Blood
2013 – Isabella Cocuzza, Arturo Paglia – The Best Offer
2014 – Domenico Procacci, Matteo Rovere – I Can Quit Whenever I Want
2015 – Luigi Musini, Olivia Musini – Black Souls, Greenery Will Bloom Again, Last Summer
2016 – Pietro Valsecchi – Quo Vado?, Chiamatemi Francesco, Don't Be Bad
2017 – Attilio De Razza, Pierpaolo Verga – Indivisible; Attilio De Razza – L'ora legale
2018 – Archimede, Rai Cinema, Matteo Garrone, Paolo Del Brocco – Dogman
2019 – Groenlandia in collaboration with Rai Cinema, 3 Marys Entertainment – The First King: Birth of an Empire, Il campione

See also 
 David di Donatello for Best Producer
 Cinema of Italy

References

External links 
 Italian National Syndicate of Film Journalists official site  

Nastro d'Argento